The Motion is a settlement located south of Bay Roberts, Newfoundland and Labrador. It is part of the town of Clarke's Beach.

See also
List of communities in Newfoundland and Labrador

Populated coastal places in Canada
Populated places in Newfoundland and Labrador

References